Wicomico County is located in the southeastern part of the U.S. state of Maryland, on the Delmarva Peninsula. As of the 2020 census, the population was 103,588. The county seat is Salisbury. The county was named for the Wicomico River, which in turn derives its name from the Algonquian language words , meaning "a place where houses are built," apparently referring to a Native American town on the banks. The county is included in the Salisbury, MD-DE Metropolitan Statistical Area.

History
Wicomico County was created from Somerset and Worcester counties in 1867.

Politics and government
Wicomico County was granted a charter form of government in 1964.

In the period after the Reconstruction era, Wicomico County became solidly Democratic due to its strong support for secession and state efforts to disenfranchise most blacks by raising barriers to voter registration. Independent insurgent white groups worked to intimidate and discourage black voters, especially in rural areas.

Maryland was a one-party state, like others in the South, until after the passage of civil rights legislation in the mid-1960s to protect the right to vote. No Republican carried Wicomico County until 1928, when Herbert Hoover won due to anti-Catholic sentiment in the heavily Protestant county against Democratic candidate Al Smith. The popular general Dwight D. Eisenhower carried Wicomico in 1952.

No Democratic presidential nominee has won Wicomico County since Lyndon Johnson’s landslide in 1964, as white conservatives increasingly moved into the Republican Party. Bill Clinton, a son of the South, came within 384 votes of beating Bob Dole in 1996. Barack Obama attracted a much higher proportion of the county vote in 2008 and 2012, likely among younger people, the educated, and other minorities. In 2020, Joe Biden came extremely close to winning the county, with Donald Trump only edging him out by 890 votes. Biden obtained 47.7% of the county's vote, the highest percentage for any Democrat since 1964.

|}

Wicomico County's government, since 2006, uses a council-elected executive system where the voters elect members of the County Council and Executive.  Prior to 2006, the county operated under a council-administrator system where voters elected council members who in turn appointed an administrator to oversee the government.

County council
The legislative functions of government are vested in the County Council. The County Council consists of seven members, five of whom are elected from single-member districts; the other two are elected at-large.

County executive
The County Executive oversees the executive branch of the County government, which consists of a number of offices and departments.  The executive branch is charged with implementing County law and overseeing the operation of County Government.  The position of County Executive was established by a modification of the County's Charter in 2006. Day-to-day functions of the executive branch fall to the appointed Director of Administration, who also serves as the Acting County Executive during vacancies in the office of the County Executive. Upon the death of Robert L. "Bob" Culver Jr., on July 26, 2020, the Wicomico County Council appointed then-Director of Administration John D. Psota to that role in an acting capacity until the 2022 election cycle for the county executive seat.

Sheriff
Law enforcement in the county is provided by the Wicomico County Sheriff's Office.  The sheriff, Mike Lewis, a Republican, is an elected official.  Municipal police agencies exist in the towns of Delmar and Pittsville, along with the cities of Fruitland and Salisbury.

State's attorney
The Wicomico County State's Attorney is responsible for prosecuting the felony, misdemeanor, and juvenile cases occurring in the county. The current elected State's Attorney is Jamie Dykes.

Geography

The county's boundary with Delaware is composed of the Mason-Dixon line and the Transpeninsular Line. The intersection of these two historical lines is the midpoint of the Transpeninsular Line, fixed by Mason and Dixon between 1763 and 1767. The county is generally flat, characteristic of the region, with a few small hills in the northeast.

Adjacent counties
 Dorchester County, Maryland (northwest)
 Somerset County, Maryland (southwest)
 Sussex County, Delaware (north)
 Worcester County, Maryland (southeast)

Major highways

Climate
The county has a humid subtropical climate (Cfa) according to the Köppen climate classification. According to the Trewartha climate classification, the subtropical boundary of eight months of daily averages of at least 50 °F (10 °C) runs through the northern part of Wicomico County. The hardiness zone is mainly 7b.

Demographics

2000 census
As of the census of 2000, there were 84,644 people, 32,218 households, and 21,779 families living in the county. There were 34,401 housing units at an average density of 91 per square mile (35/km2). The racial makeup of the county was 72.58% White, 23.29% Black or African American, 0.22% Native American, 1.75% Asian, 0.02% Pacific Islander, 0.80% from other races, and 1.34% from two or more races. 2.18% of the population were Hispanic or Latino of any race.

The largest ancestry groups in Wicomico County are 23% African American, 14% English American, 13% German, 12% Irish and 4% Italian.

There were 32,218 households, out of which 32.30% had children under the age of 18 living with them, 49.20% were married couples living together, 14.10% had a female householder with no husband present, and 32.40% were non-families. 24.80% of all households were made up of individuals, and 9.80% had someone living alone who was 65 years of age or older. The average household size was 2.53 and the average family size was 3.00.

In the county the population was spread out, with 24.80% under the age of 18, 11.80% from 18 to 24, 28.00% from 25 to 44, 22.60% from 45 to 64, and 12.80% who were 65 years of age or older. The median age was 36 years. For every 100 females there were 91.00 males. For every 100 females age 18 and over, there were 86.80 males.

The median income for a household in the county was $39,035, and the median income for a family was $47,129. Males had a median income of $32,481 versus $23,548 for females. The per capita income for the county was $19,171. About 8.70% of families and 12.80% of the population were below the poverty line, including 15.60% of those under age 18 and 8.80% of those age 65 or over.

2010 census
As of the 2010 United States Census, there were 98,733 people, 37,220 households, and 24,172 families living in the county. The racial makeup of the county was 68.7% white, 24.2% black or African American, 2.5% Asian, 0.2% American Indian, 1.9% from other races, and 2.5% from two or more races. Those of Hispanic or Latino origin made up 4.5% of the population. In terms of ancestry, 15.7% were English, 15.1% were German, 13.6% were Irish, 6.0% were American, and 5.6% were Italian.

Of the 37,220 households, 32.4% had children under the age of 18 living with them, 44.9% were married couples living together, 15.2% had a female householder with no husband present, 35.1% were non-families, and 25.3% of all households were made up of individuals. The average household size was 2.53 and the average family size was 3.01. The median age was 35.7 years.

The median income for a household in the county was $50,752 and the median income for a family was $62,150. Males had a median income of $42,408 versus $34,544 for females. The per capita income for the county was $25,505. About 7.8% of families and 14.3% of the population were below the poverty line, including 16.7% of those under age 18 and 8.5% of those age 65 or over.

2020 census 
As of the 2020 United States Census, there were 103,588 people. The racial makeup of the county was 59.3% white, 27.0% black or African American, 3.0% Asian, 0.4% American Indian and Alaskan Native, 3.7% from other races, and 6.5% from two or more races.

Education

Primary and secondary schools
Wicomico County Public Schools operates all public schools in the county.

Private schools
Faith Baptist School
Salisbury Baptist Academy
St. Frances de Sales
Salisbury Christian School
Stepping Stones Learning Academy
The Salisbury School
Wicomico Day School

Colleges and universities
 Salisbury University
 Wor-Wic Community College

Economy
Perdue Farms, a poultry and grain corporation, is headquartered in Salisbury. Piedmont Airlines is headquartered at Salisbury–Ocean City–Wicomico Regional Airport in unincorporated Wicomico County. Other major employers in the county include Salisbury University, Verizon, Peninsula Regional Medical Center, The Knowland Group, Cadista Pharmaceuticals, Chesapeake Shipbuilding, Dove Pointe, and Pepsi Bottling of Delmarva.

Other industries in Wicomico County include electronic component manufacturing, pharmaceuticals, shipbuilding, and agriculture.

Transportation
U.S. 13 runs north-south through the county, while U.S. 50 runs east-west through the county.

Salisbury–Ocean City–Wicomico Regional Airport is the only airport in the region offering commercial passenger fights. These flights are run by American Eagle to Philadelphia, Pennsylvania and Charlotte, North Carolina.

Until 1957 the Pennsylvania railroad operated the Del-Mar-Va Express train from Cape Charles, Virginia, through Salisbury Union Station to Philadelphia.

Media

Periodicals
 Coastal Style - bimonthly magazine
 The Daily Times - daily newspaper
 Metropolitan Magazine - monthly magazine
 Salisbury Independent - weekly newspaper
 Salisbury Star - monthly newspaper

Television
Salisbury is the focus city of a larger Delmarva television market, which includes Dover and the northern Eastern Shore of Virginia. Most of the market's major-network affiliates are based in Salisbury, including WBOC-TV (CBS, Telemundo, NBC, and Fox), WMDT (ABC and The CW), and Maryland Public Television station WCPB (PBS).

Communities

Cities
Fruitland
Salisbury (county seat)

Towns
Delmar
Hebron
Mardela Springs
Pittsville
Sharptown
Willards

Census-designated places

Allen
Bivalve
Jesterville
Nanticoke
Nanticoke Acres
Parsonsburg
Powellville
Quantico
Tyaskin
Waterview
Whitehaven

Unincorporated communities
Doe Run
Silver Run
Wetipquin
Whiton (partly in Worcester County)

Notable people
 Erin Burnett, born in Mardela Springs, CNBC host and currently host of Erin Burnett OutFront on CNN
 Joseph Stewart Cottman (1803–1863), born near Allen, United States Congressman from Maryland
 Alexis Denisof, born in Salisbury, actor best known for How I Met Your Mother and Angel
 Lewis J. Fields, born in Delmar, United States Marine Corps Lieutenant General
 John Glover, reared in Salisbury, actor
 Linda Hamilton, born in Salisbury, actress best known for her starring role in the television series Beauty and the Beast and the films The Terminator and Terminator 2: Judgment Day
 Maulana Karenga, born and lived in Parsonsburg, activist, author, and professor of Africana studies, best known as the creator of Kwanzaa
 Sarah Louise Northcott, convicted of murder in 1928 in Riverside County, California, and served 12 years in prison, for her role in the Wineville Chicken Coop murders—following her parole in 1940, she moved to Parsonsburg, where she resided until her death in 1944
 Frank Perdue, former president and CEO of Perdue Farms

See also
National Register of Historic Places listings in Wicomico County, Maryland

References

External links
Wicomico County government

Wicomico County Convention and Visitor's Bureau
Wicomico Public Library
Your Community Link: A Database of Community, Government, and Non-Profit organizations on the Lower Shore

 

 
Maryland counties
1867 establishments in Maryland
Salisbury metropolitan area
Populated places established in 1867
Maryland counties on the Chesapeake Bay